Ecgberht II may refer to:

 Ecgberht II of Kent (ruled 765–779)
 Ecgberht II of Northumbria (ruled 876–878 or after 883?)

See also
 Ekbert II  (c. 1060 – 1090), Count of Brunswick and Margrave of Meissen